Bill English (born 1961) was the 39th Prime Minister of New Zealand.

William English or Bill English may also refer to:
William English (physician) (fl. 1350), English physician
William English (poet) (died 1778), Irish poet
William Hayden English (1822–1896), American politician
William E. English (1850–1926), U.S. Representative from Indiana, son of William Hayden English
William John English (1882–1941), Irish recipient of the Victoria Cross
Bill English (musician) (1925–2007), American jazz drummer
Bill English (computer engineer) (1929–2020), contributor to the development of the computer mouse
Bill English (actor) (born 1983), American actor

See also
English law (disambiguation)
William English Kirwan (born 1938), chancellor of USM
William English Walling (1877–1936), American labor reformer and socialist